Donovan Henry (born 20 September 1978) is a South African cricketer. He played one first-class match in 1997/98. He was also part of South Africa's squad for the 1998 Under-19 Cricket World Cup.

References

External links
 

1978 births
Living people
South African cricketers
Western Province cricketers
Cricketers from Cape Town